Flint Hill, Virginia may refer to:
Flint Hill, Pittsylvania County, Virginia
Flint Hill, Rappahannock County, Virginia
Flint Hill School in Fairfax County